1st Battalion, The Rifles (1 RIFLES) is a light infantry battalion of The Rifles under the command of 7 Brigade.

History

The battalion formed on 1 February 2007 in Alma Barracks, Catterick Garrison as part of 52 Infantry Brigade, merging the single battalions of the Devonshire and Dorset Regiment and the Royal Gloucestershire, Berkshire and Wiltshire Regiment. The Battalion then moved in August 2007 to its permanent home of Beachley Barracks at Chepstow.

From 2008 to 2012, it was attached to 3 Commando Brigade as the fourth manoeuvre unit of the Brigade alongside the three commandos of the Royal Marines.

From March 2020, 1 RIFLES was deployed throughout Wales on Operation Rescript, supporting the UK's efforts to address the COVID-19 pandemic. The battalion helped install hospital beds at Dragon's Heart Hospital, a temporary critical care hospital for COVID-19.

References

External links
 1 Rifles

Rifles 001
Rifle regiments
Military units and formations established in 2007
Military units and formations of the Iraq War
Military units and formations of the United Kingdom in the War in Afghanistan (2001–2021)
British light infantry
The Rifles
2007 establishments in the United Kingdom